Krusha Peak is the peak rising to 2800 m in Owen Ridge, southern Sentinel Range in Ellsworth Mountains, Antarctica, surmounting Bolgrad Glacier to the southeast and Brook Glacier to the northwest.

The peak is named after the Bulgarian educator Zahariy Krusha (1808-1881).

Location
US mapping in 1961, updated in 1988.

See also
 Mountains in Antarctica

Maps
 Vinson Massif.  Scale 1:250 000 topographic map.  Reston, Virginia: US Geological Survey, 1988.
 Antarctic Digital Database (ADD). Scale 1:250000 topographic map of Antarctica. Scientific Committee on Antarctic Research (SCAR). Since 1993, regularly updated.

External links
 Bulgarian Antarctic Gazetteer. Antarctic Place-names Commission. (details in Bulgarian, basic data in English)
 Krusha Peak. SCAR Composite Gazetteer of Antarctica

External links
 Krusha Peak. Copernix satellite image

Bulgaria and the Antarctic
Ellsworth Mountains
Mountains of Ellsworth Land